Sam Goldberg, Jr. is a Canadian musician from Hudson, Quebec. He is best known as a member of Broken Social Scene, which he joined in 2007.

Early in his musical career Goldberg gained recognition as the bassist of Bodega, a Toronto-based rock band that received a nomination for "best alternative album" at the Juno Awards with their 1998 album, Bring Yourself Up. 
Prior to joining Broken Social Scene, Goldberg worked with BSS producer Dave Newfeld on Hawaii, a short-lived band whose 2003 self-titled debut received critical praise.

Goldberg's current projects include a collaboration with singer-songwriter Kandle Osborne; their debut EP, Kandle, was released in May 2012 and has garnered favorable reviews.  Goldberg is also the frontman of his own project, Yardlets, which he formed with friend Jeff Edwards in 2011.

In 2014 he was nominated for Producer Of The Year for his work on Kandle's "In Flames" at the Félix Awards which occurs on an annual basis to artists in the Canadian province of Quebec.

Discography

Kandle

 In Flames (2014)
Kandle - EP (2012)

Yardlets

Middle Ages (2012)

Broken Social Scene

Forgiveness Rock Record (2010)

Uncut

 Modern Currencies, (2006)
 Those Who Were Hung Hang Here, (2004)

Hawaii

Self Titled (2003)

Bodega

Without A Plan (2001)
Bring Yourself Up (1998)

Bionic

Self Titled (1998)

References

Musicians from Quebec
Canadian indie rock musicians
Living people
20th-century Canadian guitarists
21st-century Canadian guitarists
20th-century Canadian bass guitarists
21st-century Canadian bass guitarists
20th-century Canadian male singers
21st-century Canadian male singers
Year of birth missing (living people)